Amador Lorenzo Lemos (29 September 1954) commonly known as Amador was a Spanish footballer who played as a goalkeeper.

Honors

Club
 La Liga: 1977–78, 1984–85
 Supercopa de España: 1983
 Copa del Rey: 1980–81, 1982–83
 Copa de la Liga: 1983, 1986

References

External links
 Amador Lorenzo (Barça) at fcbarcelona.com

1954 births
Spanish footballers
Real Madrid CF players
Hércules CF players
FC Barcelona players
Association football goalkeepers
La Liga players
Living people